The GAIA Music Festival was founded by violinist Gwendolyn Masin. The festival is hosted annually, usually in the month of May, in Oberhofen and Hilterfingen, as well as the cities of Thun and Berne. The Festival is non-profit. From 2010 until 2014, the Patron of the Festival was David Zinman.

History 
First hosted in Stuttgart under a different name, the GAIA Chamber Music Festival was founded in 2006. In 2009, the festival made its debut in Switzerland and was honoured with the Göppinger Kulturpreis  - a prize awarded for outstanding and innovative voluntary cultural work. In 2014, the Festival was renamed to the GAIA Music Festival.

Musicians 
Each year, artists from all over the globe spend just over a week living, working and collaborating together in Thun. Rehearsals are open to the public.

Artists featured 
Violin: Gabriel Adorján, Anke Dill, Ilya Hoffmann, Esther Hoppe, Yura Lee, Gwendolyn Masin, Ronald Masin, Lena Neudauer, Sergey Ostrovsky, Rosanne Philippens, Rahel Rilling, Svetlin Roussev, Tatiana Samouil, Lisa Schatzman, Alexander Sitkovetsky, Jan Talich, Kirill Troussov, Isabelle van Keulen

Viola: Tomoko Akasaka, Alessandro D'Amico, Guy Ben-Ziony, Gérard Caussé, Isabel Charisius, Blythe Teh Engstroem, Jan Gruening, Lilli Maijala, Lars Anders Tomter, Dana Zemtsov

Cello: Dávid Adorján, Claudio Bohórquez, Alexander Chaushian, Nathalie Clein, Christoph Croisé, Thomas Demenga, Chiara Enderle, Andreas Fleck, Pavel Gomziakov, Louise Hopkins, Guy Johnston, Aleksei Kiseliov, Dóra Kokas, Gavriel Lipkind, Rafael Rosenfeld, Timora Rosler, Martti Rousi, Jakob Spahn, Torleif Thedéen, István Várdai, Quirine Viersen

Cimbalom: Miklós Lukács

Harpsichord: Vital Julian Frey, Sebastian Wienand

Contrabass:  James Oesi, Lars Schaper

Flute: Janne Thomsen, Kaspar Zehnder, Jacques Zoon

French Horn: Hervé Joulain

Clarinet: Reto Bieri, Don Li, Christoffer Sundqvist, Yevgeny Yehudin

Bassoon: Martin Kuuskmann, Rui Lopes
 
Saxophone: Daniel Schnyder

Piano: Julia Bartha, Alasdair Beatson, Simon Bucher, Finghin Collins, Peter Frankl, José Gallardo, Diana Ketler, Robert Kulek, Alexander Lonquich, Aleksandar Madzar, Vincenzo Maltempo, Hannes Minnaar, Pascal Rogé, Marianna Shirinyan, Cédric Pescia, Jan Philip Schulze, Dobrinka Tabakova, Roman Zaslavsky, Bálint Zsoldos

Mezzo Sopran: Jordanka Milkova, Stephanie Szanto

Harp: Sarah Christ, Jana Boušková

Percussion: Matthias Eser, Pavel Bialiayeu, Andrei Pushkarev

Ensembles: Ariel Quartet, Aviv Quartet, Grazioso Chamber Orchestra of the Hungarian National Philharmonic, Merel Quartet, Melisma Saxophone Quartet, ORIGIN Ensemble, Young European Strings Chamber Orchestra, Yurodny

Premieres 
In 2009 works by Don Li, performed by the composer with Ania Losinger, Matthias Eser, and the Tonus String Quartet were introduced to the public. The arrangement of Johan Halvorsen's "Passacaglia" - especially written for the GAIA Music Festival - received its world premiere.

In 2010, Jorge Bosso’s "Moshee" for cello and strings enjoyed its world premiere and works by Max Bruch, Johann Sebastian Bach, Pyotr Tchaikovsky, Johan Halvorsen and Robert Schumann – including the first piano quartet by the latter – were given their debut performance in Switzerland.

Compositions or transcriptions of works by Kurt Atterberg, Alban Berg, Ernest Bloch and Cesar Viana were premiered in 2011.

In 2012, transcriptions of works by Johann Sebastian Bach received premieres.

2013, the fifth birthday of GAIA in Thun, saw a celebration of new works and transcriptions played for the first time by composers such as Luigi Boccherini, Arcangelo Corelli, Astor Piazzolla, Andrei Pushkarev, Franz Schubert, and by the group Yurodny.

In 2014, Bagatelle of Benjamin Britten for violin, viola and piano and works by Paul Juon received their Swiss premier.

Daniel Schnyder was Composer-in-Residence in 2015. Among the many works of his that were played during the Festival, his "Mensch Blue" had its debut performance and "Ad Parnassum" its first performance in Switzerland.

2016 saw the first inclusion of premieres of works of literature, as well as music. Lukas Hartmann wrote texts to Telemann’s "Burlesque de Quixotte"; Stravinsky’s "Suite italienne" as well as Mussorgsky’s "Pictures at an Exhibition". The latter also received its Swiss premiere in a version for string quintet and piano.
Further works to receive international premieres were by Camille Saint-Saëns and Manuel de Falla, in arrangements written by Raymond Deane for Gwendolyn Masin's ORIGIN.

The festival programme of 2017 also included several world premieres. Massimo Pinca's "The Fates" for String Quartet and Cimbalom, OLUM by Marco Antonio Perez-Ramirez, "Bartók-Impressions" (after the "Romanian Folk Dances Sz. 68" by Béla Bartók) by Miklós Lukács, as well as Maximilian Grossenbacher's "Airreel" received their world premieres. The Swiss premiere of Rebecca Clarke's "Grotesque" also took place.

The programme of the tenth GAIA Festival saw three world premieres in 2018: "Andante für einen Oberhofer Purzelbaum" and "Bourlesque" by Thomas Fortmann and the "Hungarian-Jewish Melodies" by Raymond Deane.

Thomas Fortmann dedicated his "Dreisamkeit" for mezzo soprano, clarinet and double bass to the 11th edition of GAIA Music Festival, which also received its world premiere at the festival in 2019. Dobrinka Tabakova performed her "Whispered Lullaby" together with Gwendolyn Masin in the Swiss premiere of the work for violin and piano.

Masterclasses 
In 2010 and 2011 the festival held masterclasses called GAIA Masters. The faculty included Shmuel Ashkenasi, Igor Ozim, Wonji Kim, Philippe Graffin, Vladimir Mendelssohn, Gerard Caussé, Frans Helmerson, Philippe Muller.

Artistic Director 
Artistic director and founder of the GAIA Music Festival is violinist Gwendolyn Masin.

Discography 
GAIA Music Festival 2009: Music of Brahms, Dvorák & Prokofiev
GAIA Music Festival 2010: Music of Atterberg, Bruch, Schumann & Weiner
GAIA Music Festival 2011: Music of Berg, Bloch, Debussy, Ligeti & Webern
GAIA Music Festival 2012: Music of Krenek & Webern
GAIA Music Festival 2013: Music of Hiller & Piazzolla
GAIA Music Festival 2014: Music of Bridge & Britten
GAIA Music Festival 2015: Music of De Falla, Medtner & Schnyder
GAIA Music Festival 2016: Music of Beethoven, Mussorgsky, Popper & Stravinsky
GAIA Music Festival 2017: Music of Liszt, Beethoven & Ravel
GAIA Music Festival 2018: Music of Deane, de Falla, Fortmann & Mozart
GAIA Music Festival 2019: Music of Bartók, Brahms, von Herzogenberg & Schumann

References

External links 
 GAIA Festival
  GAIA on YouTube
 GAIA on Facebook

Chamber music festivals
Classical music festivals in Switzerland
Spring festivals
Music festivals established in 2006
Performing arts in Switzerland